"Crew" is a song by American hip hop recording artist GoldLink. It was released on December 16, 2016, as the lead single from his debut studio album, At What Cost (2017). The song, produced by Teddy Walton, features vocals from American singer Brent Faiyaz and American rapper Shy Glizzy. The song was a sleeper hit, receiving a nomination for Best Rap/Sung Performance at the 60th Annual Grammy Awards. It contains additional background vocals from Zacari.

Background and release
While talking about how the song came together in an interview with Genius, GoldLink said;

"It was the most natural song I ever did, because I met Brent, and I was with Brent in LA when we did it together. That was the first time I actually met Brent. We were just vibing, and it kind of worked the way it was. He freestyled his, and I freestyled mine. But I guess the only thing I had in my head, “Where I’m from.” The subject matter came from thinking about all the people that helped me get to where I was. To get to the position I was to even be able to get to LA and be in the studio at Pulse, to be with Brent."

Critical reception
The song received acclaim from critics. According to Ross Scarano of Billboard "there wasn't a catchier sung rap hook in 2017", also writing that "Shy Glizzy may have the show-stealing verse, but there's no denying that this raised GoldLink's clout in a major way". Calling it an "excellent rap song", Okayplayer wrote; "The hook is money, the rhymes are top notch and never fall into "mumble" status, and makes the listener feel welcomed along for the ride." Pitchfork wrote that GoldLink "manages to distill his city's amorphous hip-hop scene into a single sound", while Shy Glizzy "darts around with a shouted giddiness, stealing the show with his fist-pumping momentum" and Brent Faiyaz delivers an "elegant chorus" which "could appear on the song two more times and not be enough". Rap-Up called it "a mellow yet unforgettable smash" featuring "Shy Glizzy's awesome flow and Brent Faiyaz's moving crooning over Teddy Walton's smooth production". Jonah Mendelson from The Michigan Daily praised the artists, saying that "every member of the collaboration comes through with some of the best work of their careers", while the song "is a reminder that not every great song has to contain avant-garde experimentation or deep metaphorical meaning — there is a place for well-crafted tracks that are just an enjoyable vibe".

Accolades

Remix

The official remix of "Crew" features American rapper Gucci Mane and was released on June 21, 2017. A digital extended play (EP)—which included remixes by Lido, Richie Souf, Backyard Band and New Impressionz—was released on August 18, 2017.

Music video
The music video for the song, directed by Matthew Dillon Cohen, premiered via GoldLink's Vevo channel on March 2, 2017. Cohen filmed a prominent portion of the music video in Cheverly, Maryland, a Washington DC suburb.

Charts

Weekly charts

Year-end charts

Certifications

References

2016 singles
2016 songs
Songs written by Teddy Walton
RCA Records singles